Darreh-ye Eshkaft or Darreh Eshkaft may refer to:
 Darreh-ye Eshkaft, Lorestan
 Darreh Eshkaft-e Bala, Khuzestan Province
 Darreh Eshkaft-e Sarak, Khuzestan Province

See also
 Darreh Eshgaft (disambiguation)